Plum Grove is a ghost town in Butler County, Kansas, United States.  It was located in a rural area north of modern-day Potwin.  No buildings remain at this former community site.

History
A post office named Plum Grove was established on July 1, 1870 in northwest Butler County, Kansas.   The postmaster (and landowner) was John R. Wentworth and the post office was named for the established plum bushes near his homestead. This post office was located next to the East Branch of the Whitewater River near the modern day intersection of NW 110th Street and NW Buffalo Road.  Over the next 2 years, some businesses were started at Plum Grove.

On October 7, 1872 a county election passed funding bonds for a proposed railroad through the Whitewater River valley. Unfortunately, the financial panic of 1873 caused the rail project to be abandoned. Though it was a setback, the community continued to grow while it kept trying to get a rail depot. At its peak, Plum Grove had a maximum population of 60 or 100 (depending on source), several general stores, drug store, tree nursery, boarding house, blacksmith shop / livery barn / hog pens, saw mill, and a community water well.

In the spring of 1885, the McPherson branch of the Missouri Pacific Railroad was built east/west a few miles south of Plum Grove.  Again a railroad failed to route through Plum Grove, then the community started to dissolve. Merchants, houses, people moved over time to one of the nearby new communities of Brainerd or Potwin, and a small number to Whitewater and Peabody.  In 1887, the Chicago, Kansas and Nebraska Railway was built north/south about 5 miles west of Plum Grove, and it was the "final straw".  The post office closed on October 31, 1888 and most lots were vacated by 1889.

Afterward, the rural school was the only thing that remained.  A new school was rebuilt at the site in 1895 and it served until 1955 when it was discontinued and the building was moved.  The school water well was filled in the late 1960s, thus erasing the last evidence of Plum Grove.  Today, it is active farmland.

Geography
Plum Grove was located at the modern day intersection of NW 110th Street and NW Santa Fe Lake Road in northwest Butler County, Kansas, which is 3 miles north and 1 mile west of modern-day Potwin.  It sits on the shared township boundary of Plum Grove and Milton.

Education
The modern day rural area around Plum Grove is served by the Remington USD 206 public school district, and the rural Frederic Remington High School is about 4 miles south of the former Plum Grove.

Notable people
 Daniel McCurdy Elder (1844-1923), 1889 Kansas House of Representative, saw mill owner/operator (Plum Grove and other sites along Whitewater River), stone quarry owner (east of El Dorado).
 Frederic Sackrider Remington (1861-1909), American Old West artist, sheep rancher.  In 1883 to 1884, he owned a ranch north of Plum Grove. The south edge of it was located 2 miles north then 0.5 to 1.5 miles west. Initially his ranch started as 160 acres then later expanded to 320 acres.  Many text describe the location of his ranch near Peabody, because it was the closest railroad depot during that era.  He spent free time in both communities.  A monument dedicated to Remington is located at the nearby Frederic Remington High School.

See also
Other communities with same name in Kansas:
 Plum Grove in Atchison County, where a post office existed from October 3, 1862 to January 6, 1868, then it was moved to the community of Oak Mills.
 Plum Grove in Jefferson County, a colony that exist from 1854 to 1855.

References

Further reading

 Plum Grove, Kansas: The Rise and Demise; Jerrol Kim Claassen; Kansas State University; 23 pages + 8 page presentation; 1982.
 Frederic Remington, the Holiday Sheepman; Peggy and Harold Samuels; Kansas History: A Journal of the Central Plains; 12 pages; Vol 2, No 1, Spring 1979.
 Plum Grove, Brainerd, Whitewater, and Potwin from 1870 to 1900; Roland H. Ensz; Emporia State University; 134 pages; 1970.
 History of Butler County, Kansas; Vol P Mooney; Standard Publishing; 869 pages; 1916. Plum Grove on pages 184 to 191.
 Journals of Gerhard Classen (1881) and Elise Claassen (1915 to 1922), Colorado State University (Fort Collins).
 Peabody Newspaper Archive, 1876 to 2017. Plum Grove community news was reported in Peabody newspapers.

External links
 My Ranch, Frederic Remington, 1883 watercolor of his ranch near Plum Grove.
 Frederic Remington Area Historical Society
 Butler County maps: Current, Historic, KDOT

Ghost towns in Kansas
1870 establishments in Kansas
Populated places established in 1870